Larak Shahri (also Romanized as Lārak Shahrī; also known as Lārak Kūhī) is a village in Larak Rural District, Shahab District, Qeshm County, Hormozgan Province, Iran. At the 2006 census, its population was 466, in 98 families.  The village is located on Larak Island.

Language 
The linguistic composition of the village:

References 

Populated places in Qeshm County